KUFO (970 AM) is a commercial radio station licensed to Portland, Oregon. The station, owned by Alpha Media, calls itself "Freedom 970" and airs a talk radio format. KUFO's offices and studios are on Southwest 5th Avenue in Portland.

The transmitter is in Portland's West Hills off SW Barnes Road. KUFO broadcasts with 5,000 watts around the clock. By day, the signal is non-directional, but at night, KUFO uses a directional antenna to protect other stations on AM 970.

Programming
KUFO features mostly nationally syndicated talk shows, including Brian Kilmeade, Dave Ramsey, Sean Hannity, Mark Levin, Todd Starnes, Red Eye Radio and Lars Larson, who is also heard on co-owned 101.1 KXL-FM. Weekends feature shows on money, home improvement, real estate and food. Syndicated weekend shows include Beyond the Beltway with Bruce DuMont. Some weekend shows are paid brokered programming. Most hours begin with world and national news from Fox News Radio.

The station previously aired Portland State Vikings college football and basketball games and Portland Steel Arena Football League games. Some of those teams are now heard on co-owned sports station AM 750 KXTG.

History

Early Years
KUFO was first licensed, with the randomly assigned call letters KQP, on April 12, 1922 to the Blue Diamond Electric Company in Hood River, Oregon. KQP moved to Portland in the fall of 1925, making it one of the city's oldest radio stations. It made its Portland debut broadcast on November 9, 1925, from a studio in the Portland Hotel that was connected by private telephone line to the transmitter located "one mile north of Sylvan". In April 1926 the station was acquired by the Portland News, which changed the call sign to KOIN and moved the station's studios to the New Heathman Hotel. KOIN was a CBS Radio Network affiliate, carrying its schedule of dramas, comedies, news, sports, soap operas, game shows and big band broadcasts during the "Golden Age of Radio." It was also an affiliate of the Don Lee Network, based on the West Coast. In March 1941, KOIN moved from 940 kHz to 970 kHz, following the enactment of the North American Regional Broadcasting Agreement (NARBA).

In 1948, KOIN added an FM station, KOIN-FM, which today is co-owned 101.1 KXL-FM. KOIN-FM mostly simulcast the AM station until the late 1960s, when it began airing classical music in the evening. In 1953, KOIN put a TV station on the air, Channel 6 KOIN-TV. Because KOIN Radio was a CBS Radio affiliate, KOIN-TV carried CBS TV shows.

1950s–1980s
In the 1950s, as network programming moved from radio to television, KOIN began airing a full service middle-of-the-road format. On May 12, 1977 the call letters changed to KYTE featuring a Top 40 hits format. On September 4, 1979, it switched to country music as "97 Country."

In 1981, the station flipped to automated "Music of Your Life" adult standards programming. On January 27, 1989, KYTE began playing classical music, picking up that format when 101.1 KYTE-FM dropped classical for smooth jazz as KKCY "The City." The classical format turned out to be short-lived on AM 970.

1990s
In 1990, the station changed call letters to KESI and aired a mostly instrumental easy listening format branded as "Easy 970." On May 1, 1991, the station again changed call letters to KBBT and began stunting. 18 days later, the station began airing an alternative rock format known as "970 The Beat." In July 1996, KBBT began simulcasting on KDBX 107.5 FM (now KXJM), and tweaked its format to Modern AC. On October 2, 1996, The Beat was moved to FM, while 970 changed call letters to KUPL and switched to classic country (as "Straight Country 970").

On September 19, 1997, American Radio Systems, owner of six Portland radio stations, announced that Westinghouse Electric, the owner of CBS Radio, had bought all of its U.S. radio stations, including KUPL. KUPL switched to oldies as "Cruisin' Oldies 970" on January 23, 2001.

2000s
On August 1, 2001, KUPL changed call letters to KUFO, and on August 7, switched to a new hot talk format, branded as "Extreme Talk 970." Hosts featured on "Extreme Radio" include Bob Rivers, Don & Mike, Opie & Anthony, The Sports Junkies and Ron & Fez. On October 11, 2002, after a brief simulcast with active rock KUFO-FM, 970 changed its call letters back to KUPL, returning to classic country as "Straight Country 970."

AM 970 continued as KUPL until February 2, 2005. At that point, it became KCMD, letters chosen to reflect its "all-comedy format." That same year, after MAX 910 abandoned its hot talk format, CBS Radio (formerly Infinity Broadcasting before December 2005), hoping to enlarge the station's audience, decided to broadcast syndicated programming, including The Tom Leykis Show, Phil Hendrie, and Don and Mike, shows that had previously aired on MAX 910. At the same time, the station was renamed "Johnson 970".

By early 2006, CBS Radio asked Rick Emerson to take over as program director and return on-air after being dropped from "MAX 910." Emerson was accompanied by on-air producer Sarah X Dylan and newsman Tim Riley. Within months, Johnson 970 became "AM 970 Solid State Radio," and took on more syndicated broadcasts from around the country, including Dennis Miller.

After the launch of "Solid State Radio", the station added a local weekend show (Miles Around Radio & Television), and became the affiliate for Dr. Demento, The Mike O'Meara Show, and The John and Jeff Show, as well as syndicating Fox Sports Radio.

On June 23, 2008, KCMD's slogan changed from "Solid State Radio" to "The Talker." On March 12, 2009, The Rick Emerson Show moved to KCMD's sister station KUFO-FM to replace the canceled The Adam Carolla Show.

Alpha Broadcasting
In August 2009, CBS Radio sold its Portland cluster, including KCMD, to Alpha Broadcasting in an effort to focus on major market stations. Alpha rebranded the station to "Freedom 970" on September 14, 2009, and on May 24, 2010 changed its call letters to KXFD to reflect this branding. KXFD concentrated on mostly conservative talk shows.

On March 22, 2011, the station was reassigned the call sign KUFO which it had previously held from August 2001 to October 2002. The call sign became available after co-owned 101.1 FM changed its call letters from KUFO to KXL-FM. KUFO 970 continued its conservative talk format.

References

External links

FCC History Cards for KUFO

UFO (AM)
News and talk radio stations in the United States
Radio stations established in 1922
1922 establishments in Oregon
Alpha Media radio stations
Radio stations licensed before 1923 and still broadcasting